The 2014–15 UConn Huskies men's basketball team represented the University of Connecticut in the 2014–15 NCAA Division I men's basketball season. The Huskies were led by third-year head coach Kevin Ollie. The Huskies split their home games between the XL Center in Hartford, Connecticut, and the Harry A. Gampel Pavilion on the UConn campus in Storrs, Connecticut. The Huskies were members of the American Athletic Conference. They finished the season 20–15, 10–8 in AAC play to finish in a tie for fifth place. They advanced to the championship game of the American Athletic tournament where they lost to SMU. They were invited to the National Invitation Tournament where they lost in the first round to Arizona State.

Previous season
The Huskies finished the 2013–14 season with a record of 32-8 overall, including 12–6 in American Athletic play. They lost in the championship game of the 2014 American Athletic Conference men's basketball tournament to Louisville. They received at-large bid to the 2014 NCAA Men's Division I Basketball Tournament which they beat Saint Joseph's and Villanova in the second and third rounds, Iowa State and Michigan State in the sweet sixteen and elite eight to make it to the final four, where they beat the Florida Gators in the national semifinal round and the Kentucky Wildcats in the 2014 National Championship Game. Shabazz Napier was named the tournament's MOP.

Departures

Roster

Schedule 

|-
!colspan=12 style="background:#002868; color:white;"| Exhibition

|- 
!colspan=12 style="background:#002868; color:white;"| Regular Season

|-
!colspan=12 style="background:#002868;"| AAC Tournament

|-
!colspan=12 style="background:#002868;"| National Invitation Tournament

Rankings

References 

UConn Huskies men's basketball seasons
Connecticut
Connecticut
2014 in sports in Connecticut
2015 in sports in Connecticut